Maroli railway station is a railway station on the Western Railway network in the state of Gujarat, India. It is 8 kilometers from the Navsari railway station. Passenger, MEMU and few Express/Superfast trains halt at Maroli railway station.

Major trains

Following Express & Superfast trains halt at Maroli railway station in both direction:

 19033/34 Valsad–Ahmedabad Gujarat Queen Express
 12929/30 Valsad–Dahod Intercity Superfast Express
 19023/24 Mumbai Central–Firozpur Janata Express
 19215/16 Mumbai Central–Porbandar Saurashtra Express
 12921/22 Mumbai Central–Surat Flying Ranee Superfast Express

See also
 Navsari district

References

Railway stations in Navsari district
Mumbai WR railway division